Opuntia pilifera is a species of plants in the family Cactaceae (cacti). They are listed in CITES Appendix II.

Sources

References 

pilifera